International Trade Today is a British quarterly trade journal published in London. It is distributed throughout the United Kingdom and internationally.

International Trade Today delivers independent editorial with insight. This includes extensive news coverage, major interviews and in-depth features that provide analysis while uncovering new trading and investment opportunities. In-depth assessments of the impact of legal, financial and governmental measures that impact on international trade are also featured, as are regular articles on markets and marketing, finance and business travel, customs and law, as well as logistics and IT, including the latest international trade software developments.

The magazine has a circulation of 20,000 UK companies trading across borders, predominantly involved in export, import, outward investment and inward investment.

History 
International Trade Today was first published in 1937 as Export magazine and has been continuously published since 1946.

Contributors and reporters
Notable regular contributors to International Trade Today include Tony Bush, Ian Campbell OBE, Tim Hiscock, Mike Hodge, Joseph Baron, Paul Melly and Phil Hastings.

External links
 International Trade Today magazine Official website

Business magazines published in the United Kingdom
Quarterly magazines published in the United Kingdom
Independent magazines
Magazines published in London
Magazines established in 1937
Professional and trade magazines